The Zambonis are a Connecticut-based indie rock band formed in 1991 by musicians Dave Schneider (The LeeVees), Peter Katis, Jon Aley, and Tarquin Katis. The Zambonis write songs exclusively about ice hockey.  Schneider says of the band's musical style: “We’re the only band in the world whose two biggest influences are The Beatles and Wayne Gretzky!”

The NHL has commissioned the group to compose theme songs for the Boston Bruins and the Colorado Avalanche. The band has toured with the Stanley Cup and fundraised for Matt Cullen's organization, Cullen Children's Foundation.

In deference to the ice resurfacer and Frank Zamboni, The Zambonis are a licensee of the Zamboni Company.

History
The Zambonis debut album, 100% Hockey...and Other Stuff, was recorded at Tarquin Studios in Connecticut, USA and was released in 1996. The 15-song disc cracked the Top 40 on the CMJ charts, and was added to the NHL, NCAA and minor league hockey arena playlists.

In October 1999, the band released its second full-length album, More Songs About Hockey...and Buildings and Food.

In 2002, the Zambonis opened the NHL All-Star Game along with Jewel and Five for Fighting.

In 2003, The Zambonis released a new album, Chippy Sessions, a compilation of rare live cuts, singles and demos.

Members
 Dave Schneider - guitar, bass, vocals
 Jon Aley - guitar, bass, keyboards, drums
 Mat Orefice - drums, vocals
 Tom Andrukevich - bass, guitar, vocals
 Shawn Fogel - guitar, bass, keyboards, sax, vocals
 Tarquin Katis - bass, hardcore vocalist
 Peter Katis - producer, guitar, drums, vocals
 Steve Tanski - guitar, bass, vocals
 Cary Polick - guitar, vocals
 Matt Gonzalez - Hockey Monkey
 Bob Anderson - Drums
 Rich Dart - Drums

In popular media
In 2000, the Zambonis single "Hockey Monkey" was featured in the Mr. Wong episode "Meet the Creep, Pt. 2".

In 2002, four Zambonis songs were featured on the Midway video game NHL Hitz 20-03.

In March 2006, The Zambonis single "Hockey Monkey" (co-written by cartoonist James Kochalka) was chosen by Fox as the theme song to a new sitcom called The Loop.

Discography

Albums
100% Hockey...and Other Stuff (1996)
More Songs About Hockey...and Buildings and Food (1999)
To Bleed Black and Gold (2000)
Chippy Sessions (2003)
Greatest Hits (2007, Nettwerk)
Fight On The Ice (2008)
Five Minute Major (in d minor) (2012)

Singles/EPs/Compilations
"Away Game/Referee's Daughter/Shot Score " (1995)
"Play-Off Fever EP " (1997)
"Avalanche" (1997, split single with Lazerboy)
"Tarquin Records Holiday Extravaganza" (1997 compilation)
"Red Roses For Me" (2000, compilation)
"Greasy Kid Stuff" (2002, compilation)
Split EP with Harry and the Potters (2006, split EP)
"Up End Atom" - Atom and His Package Tribute (2009 compilation)

References

External links
thezambonis.com - Official page
The Zambonis MySpace page

Musical groups established in 1991
Indie rock musical groups from Connecticut
Indie pop groups from Connecticut
1991 establishments in Connecticut
Musical groups from Bridgeport, Connecticut